Diva Hadamira Gastélum Bajo (born 30 July 1961) is a Mexican politician affiliated with the PRI. She currently serves as Senator of the LXII Legislature of the Mexican Congress. She also served as Deputy during the LXI Legislature.

References

1961 births
Living people
Politicians from Sinaloa
Women members of the Senate of the Republic (Mexico)
Members of the Senate of the Republic (Mexico)
Members of the Chamber of Deputies (Mexico)
Institutional Revolutionary Party politicians
Women members of the Chamber of Deputies (Mexico)
People from Guasave
Autonomous University of Sinaloa alumni
Members of the Congress of Sinaloa
20th-century Mexican politicians
20th-century Mexican women politicians
21st-century Mexican politicians
21st-century Mexican women politicians